
Year 335 BC was a year of the pre-Julian Roman calendar. At the time, it was known as the Year of the Consulship of Calenus and Corvus (or, less frequently, year 419 Ab urbe condita). The denomination 335 BC for this year has been used since the early medieval period, when the Anno Domini calendar era became the prevalent method in Europe for naming years.

Events 
 By place 

 Greece 
 Returning to Macedonia by way of Delphi (where the Pythian priestess acclaims him "invincible"), King Alexander III of Macedonia advances into Thrace in order to secure the Danube as the northern boundary of the Macedonian kingdom. After forcing the Shipka Pass and crushing the Triballi, he crosses the Danube to disperse the Getae. Turning west, he then defeats and shatters a coalition of Illyrians who are invading Macedonia.
 A rumour that Alexander has been killed by the Illyrians leads the Thebans and Athenians to take up arms again. Alexander defeats the Greeks and razes Thebes. In Thebes, 6,000 people are killed and all survivors are sold into slavery.
 After conquering Thebes, Alexander demands the surrender of the mercenary commanders, Chares and Charidemus, among others. Chares escapes to the Troad while Charidemus is banished and flees to Persia.
 The admiration of Alexander for the Athenian orator and diplomat, Demades, leads the conqueror to treat Athens leniently despite its involvement in the rebellion. A special Athenian embassy led by Phocion, an opponent of the anti-Macedonian faction, is able to persuade Alexander to give up his demand for the exile of the leaders of the anti-Macedonian party, particularly Demosthenes.
 Aristotle returns to Athens from Macedon and opens a peripatetic school in an old gymnasium called the Lyceum. It contains a museum of natural history, zoological gardens and a library.

 Roman Republic 
 Marcus Valerius Corvus is elected consul of the Roman Republic for the fourth time.
 Cales (modern Calvi), a city in Campania, is taken by the Romans and a Roman colony is established there.

 By topic 

 Art 
 The sculptor Praxiteles ends his active career in Athens (approximate date).

Births 
 Herophilos, Greek physician and first anatomist (d. 280 BC)

Deaths 
 Hicetas of Syracuse, Greek mathematician and philosopher (b. c. 400 BC)
 Eubulus, Athenian statesman (b. c. 405 BC)

References